A line starve describes the feeding of paper in a line printer back one line or moving the cursor on a character terminal up one line. It is the opposite of a line feed. This term is also used to describe the control character or escape sequence which causes this action. This is not a standard ASCII character, but it is defined as the ISO 6429 and Unicode "Reverse Line Feed" C1 control code (U+008D).

See also
 Newline

External links
 Line Starve on HackersDictionary.com
 Line Starve on Foldoc.org

Control characters
Whitespace